Kilcoursey is a barony in County Offaly (formerly King's County), Republic of Ireland.

Etymology
The name Kilcoursey is from Kilcoursey Castle (also called Lehinch Castle; near Clara), which is named for Kilcoursey townland (Irish Cill Chuairsí, "Cuairseach's church").

Location

Kilcoursey barony is located in north County Offaly, south of the Gageborough River.

History
The Ó Sionnaigh (later Fox) O'Catharniagh (O'Carney) clan were chiefs in Kilcoursey, referred to as Muinter Tadgain, which also included Clonlonan barony in Westmeath. Ó Cearnaigh (Kearney), princes of Tethbae (Westmeath), are of this branch. The Mac Amhlaigh (MacAuley) sept are also cited as holding a portion of this barony.

List of settlements

Below is a list of settlements in Kilcoursey barony:
Clara
Horseleap (western part)

References

Baronies of County Offaly